Raqqeh Rural District is in Eresk District of Boshruyeh County, South Khorasan province, Iran. At the National Census of 2006, its population (as a part of the former Boshruyeh District of Ferdows County) was 2,429 in 656 households. There were 2,278 inhabitants in 667 households at the following census of 2011, by which time the district had been separated from the county and Boshruyeh County established. At the most recent census of 2016, the population of the rural district was 2,398 in 794 households. The largest of its 35 villages was Raqqeh, with 1,096 people.

References 

Boshruyeh County

Rural Districts of South Khorasan Province

Populated places in South Khorasan Province

Populated places in Boshruyeh County